Dunkirk is an American Thoroughbred Racehorse born in 2006.  He is the son of graded stakes winner and major sire Unbridled's Song and multiple Grade 1 winner Secret Status.  He is owned by a syndicate composed of John Magnier, Derrick Smith, and Michael Tabor and trained by Todd Pletcher during his short racing career.  Dunkirk acquired a measure of celebrity during the 2007 Keeneland Yearling Auction, where he sold for $3.7million.

Unraced at 2, he broke his maiden at age 3 in 2009 at first asking at Gulfstream Park.  He followed that win with an Allowance victory, also at Gulfstream Park.  He then placed second in the Florida Derby, a race in which victorious Quality Road set a new track record.

In the 2009 Kentucky Derby, Dunkirk finished 11th after stumbling badly at the beginning.  This was the first time he had failed to finish in the top two.  He then skipped the mid-May Preakness Stakes and aimed for the Belmont Stakes in early June at Belmont Park.

After setting a fast pace for the first 6 furlongs, Dunkirk was overtaken in the stretch but fought back to finish 2nd behind eventual 3-year old champion Summer Bird, beating the Kentucky Derby winner, Mine That Bird.  After the race, it was discovered that Dunkirk had suffered a condylar fracture in his left hind cannon bone.  After a successful surgery, Dunkirk was expected to return to racing in 2010 at age 4, but he instead was retired to stand stud at Ashford Stud in Kentucky.

Pedigree
Dunkirk's sire and dam are both Grade 1 Stakes winners, and both of his grandsires are Triple Crown race winners (Unbridled won the 1990 Kentucky Derby; A.P. Indy won the 1992 Belmont Stakes).

References

 
 

2006 racehorse births
Racehorses bred in Kentucky
Racehorses trained in the United States
Thoroughbred family 8-g